Niklas Grahn, better known by his stage name Niello, is a Swedish rapper and electronic hip hop artist. His name derives from niello decoration made of mixture of copper, silver, and lead, and used as a weapon on engraved or etched metal. He is signed to Sony Music Sweden.

Niello gained fame through his initial release, "Svett". His single "Legenden", released in June 2013 featuring Phantomen, garnered him great chart success, reaching number 3 on the Swedish Singles Chart. It was also certified 2× Platinum in the country.

He participated in Melodifestivalen 2022 with the song ”Tror du att jag bryr mig” with Lisa Ajax. They performed in Heat 2 on 12 February 2022, finishing in last place and failing to qualify.

Discography

Albums

Singles

Notes

References

Links
 Profile, posk.se; accessed 13 March 2018. 
 Profile, merinfo.se; accessed 13 March 2018. 
 Profile, ratsit.se; accessed 13 March 2018. 

Swedish rappers
Living people
Swedish-language singers
Year of birth missing (living people)
Melodifestivalen contestants of 2022